Serve & Collect III is the fourth studio album by American hip hop group Boss Hogg Outlawz. It was released on August 30, 2011 through Boss Hogg Outlawz/eOne Music. The album marked the departure of founding members Chris Ward and Killa Kyleon, who left the group prior to the album's release.

The album did not chart on the Billboard 200, though it did make it to four other charts including the R&B and rap charts.

Track listing

Personnel
Stayve Jerome Thomas – performer (tracks: 1-14), executive producer
M.U.G. – performer (tracks: 2, 4-5, 9-13, 16)
Andre "Dre Day" Stephens – performer (tracks: 1-3, 7-8, 11-12, 14)
Le$ – performer (tracks: 3-7, 11-14)
Larry Wayne Jones, Jr. – performer (tracks: 1, 3, 6, 8-10)
S. Witfield – performer (tracks: 12, 15-16)
T. Harris – performer (track 15)
Mark A. Miller – performer (track 10)
Hoodstar Chantz – performer (track 15)
King Rashee – performer (track 15)
Lil Ray – performer (track 15)
Leroy Williams, Jr. – producer (tracks: 2-3, 6-8, 10-12, 14-15, 18), mixing (track 11)
Brandon Pitre – producer (tracks: 4-5, 13, 17)
Gavin Luckett – producer (tracks: 4-5, 13, 17), mixing & engineering (tracks: 4-5, 13)
K.C. Tha Realist – producer (tracks: 1, 9)
Justin Rogers – producer (tracks 16)
DJ Ryno – mixing (tracks: 1-3, 6-10, 12, 14-15)
J.T. – mixing (tracks: 1-3, 6-10, 12, 14-15)
Raymond Thomas – mixing (track 16), engineering (tracks: 3, 7, 14, 16), executive producer
Derick Tisby – engineering (tracks: 1-2, 6, 8-12)
Young Samm – engineering (track 15)
Michael George Dean – mastering
Mike Frost – artwork & design

Chart history

References

2011 albums
E1 Music albums
Slim Thug albums
Boss Hogg Outlawz albums
Sequel albums